The National Soccer League Coach of the Year was an annual soccer award presented to coaches in Australia. It recognised the most outstanding manager in the National Soccer League each season. The award was established in the first NSL season, 1977.

In 1977, it was given to Rale Rasic who came second in the NSL season that year with Marconi. The last winner of the award was Mich d'Avray, who won the 2003–04 season with Perth Glory. Eddie Thomson won the award three times, the most for an NSL manager.

Winners

Multiple winners

Awards won by nationality 

aOnly managers with a verifiable nationality are included

bFrank Arok, Rale Rasic and Branko Culina are included in both totals

Awards won by club

References 

National Soccer League (Australia)
Awards established in 1977
1977 establishments in Australia
Association football manager of the year awards
Australian soccer trophies and awards